Andhra Pradesh is a state in southern India.

Andhra may also refer to:
 Āndhra (tribe), ancient Indian tribe
 Andhra Dynasty or Satavahana dynasty, a South and Central Indian dynasty from 3rd century BCE–mid 3rd century CE
 Andhra State (1953–1956), a former state in India
 Andhra Pradesh (1956–2014), successor to Andhra State, and precursor to Andhra Pradesh and Telangana
 Andhra University, a university in Visakhapatnam, Andhra Pradesh
 Andhra Bank, a former public sector bank of India
 Coastal Andhra, a region in Andhra Pradesh

See also
 Andhra in Indian epic literature, a tribe or kingdom mentioned in Aitareya Brahmana of Rigveda and in the epics Ramayana and Mahabharata
 Andra (disambiguation)